Goodyhills is a hamlet in the civil parish of Holme St Cuthbert, in northern Cumbria, United Kingdom. It is located 1.5 miles east of the village of Mawbray, and 23 miles west of the city of Carlisle.

A quarter of a mile to the north-west is the parish seat of Holme St Cuthbert, where the local primary school and parish church are located, and half a mile to the south-east is the small hamlet of Jericho. At nearby Newtown, there is a farm park and tea room called the Gincase. Goodyhills has no nearby public transport links; the closest railway station is at Aspatria, and the closest stop on a regular bus service is on the B5300 coast road at Mawbray.

William Wilson, noted English academic, was born in Goodyhills in 1875, and attended nearby Holme St Cuthbert primary school. He attained his PhD at Leipzig University in Germany in 1902, and went on to become a lecturer at King's College, London. He became a Fellow of the Royal Society in 1923, and ended his career at Bedford College, London in 1944.

Etymology
The name "Goodyhills" comes from Old English, and means "godlike (or sacred) hills". It has been spelled in several different ways in the past, including Guddyhills, Goddy-hills, Gowdyhowse, and Goodlike-hills.

References

Hamlets in Cumbria
Holme St Cuthbert